BTCC may refer to:

 Baltic Touring Car Championship
 Beijing Television Cultural Center
 Benedict (Timothy Carlton) Cumberbatch
 Blackwood Town Cricket Club
 British Touring Car Championship
 BTCC (company)